Charles Hardwick was an English cleric and historian.

Charles Hardwick may also refer to:

Charles Hardwick (antiquary) (1817–1889), English writer known for works related to Lancashire
Charles Hardwick (judge) (1885–1984), Australian barrister and judge